Novato High School (NHS) is a public high school located in Novato, California, in Marin County. It is a part of the Novato Unified School District.

History

Built in 1955 and founded in 1957, three years before Novato was incorporated as a city, it is one of two comprehensive high schools in the Novato Unified School District, the other being San Marin High School.

Demographics

Since the mid-1980s, the school's student population has ranged from 1000 to 1200 students.
In the 2018–2019 school year, the demographic distribution was as follows: Caucasian (46.7%), Latino (38.1%), Asian/Other Asian (6.2%), Two or More Races (4.7%), African American (2.8%), Native American (1.1%) and Pacific Islander (0.4%).

Campus

NHS rests on a 38-acre site, with two gymnasiums, a Lecture Hall/Performing Arts Center, three computer centers, a library with a computer lab, dance studio, weight room, locker rooms, a wing for visual art classrooms, and a wing for music classrooms. Outdoor facilities include tennis courts, basketball courts, softball diamond, baseball stadium, turf football stadium with a track, soccer field, and a newly renovated swimming pool.

One of the most exciting aspects of the climate and culture of the school is the dynamic Leadership class (ASB).  Another student-led organization on campus is the Link Crew (since 2015). Link Crew has 11 and 12 grade students act as mentors and role models for the incoming 9 grade class to help in the transition from middle to high school.

Curriculum

Novato High School has several comprehensive academic program including college preparatory courses, Honors and Advanced Placement classes, fine and performing arts classes, and industrial arts courses.  Novato High School also provides support services such as the English Language Development (ELD) Programs for those students who require additional resources. Advanced Placement offerings include: AP Music Theory, AP Art History, AP Human Geography, AP European History, AP US History, AP Government, AP Economics, Calculus AB/BC, AP Biology, AP Physics, AP Stats, AP English Language, AP English Literature, AP Studio Art and AP Spanish.

Novato High School is home to the Marin Design Center, which houses the Product Design and Programming classes.  This innovative College and Career pathway program gives students the resources and opportunity to take their talent and ingenuity to the next level with guidance from Mr. Glenn Corey.  NHS Product Design students will get the training necessary to advance on to Engineering, Robotics, Design, Physics, and Programming in college or eventually receiving certification for employment.

Performing and visual arts

Marin School of the Arts (MSA) has many notable programs, including Dance, Theater, Musical Theater, Visual Arts, Creative Writing, Film, and a music program that includes 3 jazz bands, a concert band, a symphonic band, and chamber and rock groups. Jazz and music studies is currently headed by Grammy nominated musician, Dr Greg Johnson. The Rock Band program is run by Scott Thunes, bassist for Frank Zappa. MSA was founded in 2003 by Mark Peabody.

Athletics
Novato competes in the Marin County Athletic League (MCAL).  Novato is a member of the North Coast Section(NCS) of the California Interscholastic Federation.

Lacrosse
The girls' lacrosse program has won both the MCAL and NCS (division 1) title four years in a row, spanning from 2015 to 2018. The program has been dominant with an overall record of 95–5 in these four years. In the early 2010s, the team petitioned to play up in the strongest division of the NCS (division 1) for all four of these championships. The 2016 team was undefeated and ranked #24 nationally. The team's national presence increased in 2017, the team was ranked #12 in the nation and #2 in California. By 2018, the teams’ national ranking increased to #8 and topped the 4-peat off with a #1 overall ranking in the state.

The boys' lacrosse program has won three (MCAL) county championships, once in 2005 and again in 2011, and once more in 2013. In 2013, they went on to go to the NCS final, where they once again met Redwood, this time in the championship, where they lost.

Both the Boys' and Girls' programs have Varsity and JV teams.

Football
The Hornets football program went to six NCS Division 2A/3 championships in 7 years, winning in 2002, 2005, 2006 & 2007. On Dec. 9th, 2007, the varsity football team was elected to play in California's Div. II State Championship in Carson, CA. Novato lost to Oceanside of San Diego, 28–14 after a significant loss of their quarterback due to leg injury.

Novato's most recent notable season for varsity was 2014 as they were crowned MCAL champions. 2017 is the most notable for Junior Varsity as they went 7–2, winning the first Novato City Football Championship for NHS at any level in 3 years. Novato has not had a freshman team since 2015, yet won the Freshman MCAL title in 2013 and 2011.

In July 2017, Novato's varsity football team was dropped due to lack of summer turnout. The school's loss gained local media coverage and was revived due to a player and parent push for fellow students to fill the spots of the team.

The program has both JV and Varsity teams.

Soccer
The boys' soccer team came in first in the North Coast Section tournament for the first time in school history in 2007 beating Marin Catholic 1–0. As of the 2018–19 season, Novato had both Varsity and Junior Varsity for Boys and Girls' programs.

Baseball
The baseball program has won four MCAL titles and won the North Coast Section championship in the spring of 2007. 

Novato offers both JV and Varsity teams as of 2020.

In 2020, spearheaded by the class of 2020 and parents alike, Novato’s baseball field was resurfaced with turf while its surrounding facilities were given a thorough facelift.

Basketball
The girls' basketball program won the California state Div. II championship in the 1986 season, in which they went undefeated, 35–0. In the 2017–18 season, the boys' program had Freshman, JV, and Varsity teams, with the Varsity team making playoffs for the first time in 6 years. The girls' program had a JV and Varsity team, with Varsity notably going deeper into playoffs than in previous years.

On December 3, 2019, the Boy's varsity team beat cross town rival San Marin for the first time in five years.

Water polo
The Novato High School Varsity Water Polo team received third place at the county level. Both the boys' and girls' programs had JV and Varsity teams in the fall 2017 season. (Marin County Athletic League) in 2005 and 2006..

Wrestling
The varsity wrestling team won the MCAL league title in 2012 and 2014, 2012 being the first MCAL title since 1993. The 1969 wrestling team, coached by the "Father of Marin wrestling", Ralph Cutler, won the NorCal championship tournament led by undefeated twin brothers, Ken & Kirt Donaldson. The Donaldson's were named Co-Outstanding Wrestlers, and subsequently attained NCAA Division I All-American status for the USAF Academy in 1971. Three-sport athlete Paul Robertson, was the 141 lbs. NorCal wrestling champion in 1970.

Cheer and dance
Novato has both Varsity and JV Cheer and Dance teams. Competing in various seasons throughout the year, the program supports both football and basketball at home games.

The program won three national competition championships in 4 years; in 2016 and 2018–19.

Notable athletes
Competitive sailor and Olympian John Kostecki attended Novato High School.

Future football coach and former Novato quarterback Mike Moroski went on to play at UC Davis and was their first quarterback to achieve active status in the NFL.  He played for Atlanta (1979–84), Houston (1985) and San Francisco (1986), and coached at UC Davis from 1987 to 2012 before being named the head coach for College of Idaho on January 9, 2013. Additionally, Moroski was a star pitcher for the Novato and the UC Davis baseball teams, and was enshrined into the UC Davis Athletic Hall of Fame in 1985.

Olympic water polo player, Ellen Estes, played both for Stanford and Team USA, enshrined in the USA Water Polo Hall of Fame in 2012.

Notable alumni
Amory Kane (1964), recording artist
Mike Moroski (1975), NFL quarterback from UC Davis
Yvonne Cagle (1977), M.D., NASA Astronaut
Eric Shanower (1981), author, cartoonist
John Kostecki (1982), Olympic sailor
Ellen Estes (1996), Olympic and collegiate water polo player who won the 2002 NCAA National Championship for Stanford University, and silver medal at the 2000 Summer Olympics and bronze medal at the 2004 Summer Olympics for the USA National Women's Water Polo Team.
Anna Wise (2009), Singer known best for collaborating with Kendrick Lamar
Wil Dasovich (2009), television personality, model and YouTube vlogger
Seth Morris, actor and comedian

References

High schools in Marin County, California
Public high schools in California
Novato, California
1957 establishments in California